Unitary Federation of Petroleum and Gas Workers (FUTPV) is the main national labor union of workers in the petroleum and gas industries in Venezuela. It represents over 67,000 workers, including most workers of PDVSA.

External links
 http://futpv.org/

Trade unions in Venezuela
Energy organizations